Anka Makovec (3 August 1938 – 16 February 2017) was a Slovene-Australian artist and environmental activist.

Biography
Makovec was born on 3 August 1938 in Ročinj, Slovenia. She emigrated to Australia when she was 24. Makovec attended art classes and workshops in Tasmania and is best known for her watercolors.

Environmental Activism 
During her time in Tasmania, Makovec lived with the Aboriginal Australians. In the 1980s, she became an environment activist and joined the United Tasmania Group in their opposition to hydroelectric power plants in the jungle. She was a member of the Tasmanian Wilderness Society at a time when that group was opposing the proposed Franklin Dam on the Gordon River in Tasmania, Australia. She was assaulted on the Strahan wharf in 1983 by pro-dam activists around the time the dam construction was halted.

Makovec died on 16 February 2017 in Devonport, Tasmania, at the age of 78.

Makovec's environmental activism is the subject of the documentary "Anka Tasmanka".

References

Further reading
 Anka Makovec interview Immigration Place Australia
 Anka Makovec – The lady that defined what is possible in river conservation EcoAlbania

1938 births
2017 deaths
Australian painters
People from the Municipality of Kanal
Australian women environmentalists
Slovenian emigrants to Australia